Metopoceras felicina is a moth of the family Noctuidae. It is found in Portugal, Spain, the Canary Islands, and the western parts of the Maghreb countries. This is a thermophilous species found in Thermo and Meso-Mediterranean habitats with xerophilous grasslands and light scrubland.

Adults are on wing from February to June. There is one generation per year.

Subspecies
Metopoceras felicina felicina
Metopoceras felicina calderana (Canary Islands)
Metopoceras felicina purpurariae (Canary Islands)

External links
Fauna Europaea
Lepiforum.de

Metopoceras
Moths of Europe
Moths of the Middle East
Taxa named by Hugues-Fleury Donzel